The F136, commonly known as Ferrari-Maserati engine, is a family of 90° V8 petrol engines jointly developed by Ferrari and Maserati and produced by Ferrari; these engines displace between 4.2 L and 4.7 L, and produce between  and . All engines are naturally aspirated, incorporate dual overhead camshafts, variable valve timing, and four valves per cylinder.

The architecture was produced in various configurations for Ferrari and Maserati automobiles, and the Alfa Romeo 8C. Production started in 2001.  Ferrari was spun-off from their common parent company in January 2016 and has stated they will not renew the contract to supply engines to Maserati by 2022.

Starting with the 2013 Maserati Quattroporte GTS, and following with the 2014 Ferrari California T, the F136 was replaced by the twin turbocharged Ferrari F154 V8 engine.

Applications
Maserati and Alfa Romeo versions have crossplane crankshafts, while Ferrari versions are flat plane.

Maserati

Engine Data & Variants sourced from the Maserati Academy.

Ferrari

Road engines

Racing engines

Alfa Romeo

Outside Fiat Group

A1GP usage

Awards
The F136 engine family has won a total of 8 awards in the International Engine of the Year competition.
The F136 FB engine variant was awarded "Best Performance Engine" and "Above 4.0 litre" recognitions in 2011 and 2012, while the F136 FL variant won the same categories in 2014 and 2015.

References

External links
 Ferrari F430 specifications
 Ferrari World

Ferrari engines
Maserati
Gasoline engines by model
V8 engines